The seven dirty words are seven English-language curse words that American comedian George Carlin first listed in his 1972 "Seven Words You Can Never Say on Television" monologue. The words, in the order Carlin listed them, are: "shit", "piss", "fuck", "cunt", "cocksucker", "motherfucker", and "tits".

At the time, the words were considered highly inappropriate and unsuitable for broadcast on the public airwaves in the United States, whether radio or television. As such, they were avoided in scripted material and bleep censored in the rare cases in which they were used. Broadcast standards differ in different parts of the world, then and now, although most of the words on Carlin's original list remain taboo on American broadcast television. The list was not an official enumeration of forbidden words, but rather were compiled by Carlin to flow better in a comedy routine. Nonetheless, a radio broadcast featuring these words led to a Supreme Court 5–4 decision in 1978 in FCC v. Pacifica Foundation that the FCC's declaratory ruling did not violate either the First or Fifth Amendments, thus helping define the extent to which the federal government could regulate speech on broadcast television and radio in the United States.

Background
During a performance in 1966, comedian Lenny Bruce said he had been arrested for saying nine words: "ass", "balls", "cocksucker", "cunt", "fuck", "motherfucker", "piss", "shit", and "tits".  In 1972, comedian George Carlin released his fourth stand-up album Class Clown. One track on the album, "Seven Words You Can Never Say on Television", was a monologue in which he identified these words and expressed amazement that they could not be used regardless of context. In a 2004 NPR interview, he said:

Carlin was arrested for disturbing the peace when he performed the routine at a show at Summerfest in Milwaukee in 1972. On his next album, 1973's Occupation: Foole, he performed a similar routine titled "Filthy Words", dealing with the same list and many of the same themes. Pacifica station WBAI broadcast this version of the routine uncensored on October 30 that year.

Federal Communications Commission v. Pacifica Foundation

In 1973 John Douglas, an active member of Morality in Media, claimed that he heard the WBAI broadcast while driving with his then 15-year-old son, Dean, and complained to the Federal Communications Commission (FCC) that the material was inappropriate for the time of day (approximately 2:00 p.m.).

Following the lodging of the complaint, the FCC proceeded to ask Pacifica for a response, then issued a declaratory order upholding the complaint. No specific sanctions were included in the order, but WBAI was put on notice that "in the event subsequent complaints are received, the Commission will then decide whether it should utilize any of the available sanctions it has been granted by Congress". WBAI appealed against this declaratory ruling, and the ruling was overturned by the United States Court of Appeals for the District of Columbia Circuit in a 2–1 decision on the grounds that the FCC's definition of "indecency" was overbroad and vague and thus violated the First Amendment's guarantee of free speech. The FCC in turn appealed to the Supreme Court. As an independent federal agency, the FCC filed the appeal in its own name. The United States Department of Justice intervened in the case, supporting Pacifica's argument that the FCC's declaratory ruling violated the First Amendment and that it also violated the Fifth Amendment in that the FCC's definition of "indecency" was too vague to support criminal penalties.

In 1978, the Supreme Court, in a 5–4 decision, ruled that the FCC's declaratory ruling did not violate either the First or Fifth Amendments, but it limited the scope of its decision to the specific broadcast that caused the declaratory ruling and declined to consider whether the FCC's definition of indecency would survive a First Amendment challenge if applied to the broadcast of other material containing the same or similar words which had been cited in Pacifica's brief (e.g., works of Shakespeare – "pissing conduits", "bawdy hand of the dial on the prick of noon"; the Bible – "he who pisseth against the wall"; the Watergate Tapes). It noted that while the declaratory ruling pertained to the meaning of the term "indecency" as used in a criminal statute (18 USC 1464), since the FCC had not imposed any penalty on Pacifica, the Court did not need to reach the question as to whether the definition was too vague to satisfy the due process requirements of the Fifth Amendment.

This decision formally established indecency regulation in American broadcasting. In follow-up rulings, the Supreme Court established the safe harbor provision that grants broadcasters the right to broadcast indecent (but not obscene) material between the hours of 10 pm and 6 am, when it is presumed few children would be watching. The FCC has never maintained a specific list of words prohibited from the airwaves during the time period from 6 am to 10 pm.

The seven dirty words have been assumed to be likely to elicit indecency-related action by the FCC if uttered on a TV or radio broadcast, and thus the broadcast networks generally censor themselves with regard to many of the seven dirty words. The FCC regulations regarding "fleeting" use of expletives were ruled unconstitutionally vague by a three-judge panel of the U.S. 2nd Circuit Court of Appeals in New York on July 13, 2010, as they violated the First Amendment due to their possible effects regarding free speech.

The words

The original seven words named by Carlin are:
 shit
 piss
 fuck
 cunt
 cocksucker
 motherfucker
 tits

In subsequent routines, Carlin would frequently deconstruct the list, proposing additions or deletions based on audience feedback, or sometimes on his own whims. For example, a man asked him to remove motherfucker because, as a derivative of fuck, it constituted a duplication: "He says motherfucker is a duplication of the word fuck, technically, because fuck is the root form, motherfucker being derivative; therefore, it constitutes duplication. And I said, 'Hey, motherfucker, how did you get my phone number, anyway?.

He later added it back, claiming the bit's rhythm does not work without it. In his comedy routine, Carlin would make fun of each word; for example, he would say that tits should not be on the list because it sounds like a nickname of a snack ("New Nabisco Tits! ... corn tits, cheese tits, tater tits!").

Availability
Carlin performed the routine many times and included it, in whole or in part on several of his records and HBO specials. Parts or all of the performance appear on the following releases:
 1972 – Class Clown – Audio recording – "Seven Words You Can Never Say on Television"
 1973 – Occupation: Foole – Audio recording – "Filthy Words"
 1977 – George Carlin at USC – HBO special – "Forbidden Words"
 1978 – George Carlin: Again! – HBO special – "Dirty Words"
 1983 – Carlin at Carnegie – HBO special – "Filthy Words"

The Carlin at Carnegie version can be heard as "An Incomplete List of Impolite Words" on the 1984 album Carlin on Campus (but not in the HBO special, Carlin on Campus). That version of the list features over 300 dirty words and phrases in an effort to stop people telling him that he left something off the list. Four days after Carlin's original Class Clown recording, the routine was performed again for students at the University of California, Los Angeles. This would be months before its first official release. The recording was restored in December, 2013 and uploaded to YouTube by archivists at UCLA and could be accessed free of charge, but is no longer available due to a claim of copyright infringement.
The FCC ruling is referenced in "Offensive Language" from the album Parental Advisory: Explicit Lyrics and HBO special Doin' It Again, both 1990 recordings of the same performance; however, the routine that follows is entirely different.

The Class Clown version can also be heard on the vinyl/cassette only release Indecent Exposure (1978). The Occupation: Foole version can also be heard on Classic Gold (1992). Both versions were re-released again as part of The Little David Years (1971–1977).

H.R. 3687
U2 singer Bono said on live television that his 2003 Golden Globe Award was "really, really fucking brilliant!" Despite complaints, the Federal Communications Commission (FCC) did not fine the network. In apparent reaction, on December 8, 2003, Rep. Doug Ose (R-California) introduced House Resolution 3687, the "Clean Airwaves Act", in Congress to designate a derivative list of Carlin's offensive words as profane in the U.S. Code. The stated purpose of the bill was "To amend section 1464 of title 18 of the United States Code, to provide for the punishment of certain profane broadcasts." In the text of the bill, the words shit, piss, fuck, cunt, asshole, and the phrases cock sucker, mother fucker, and ass hole are specifically listed. The bill was not enacted.

Subscription services

The FCC obscenity guidelines do not apply to non-broadcast media such as cable television, satellite TV, or satellite radio. Whether the FCC or the Department of Justice could be empowered by the Congress to restrict indecent content on cable television without such legislation violating the Constitution has never been settled by a court of law. Since cable television must be subscribed to in order to receive it legally, subscribers who object to the content being delivered may cancel their subscription, an incentive is created for the cable operators to self-regulate (unlike broadcast television, cable television is not legally considered to be "pervasive", nor does it depend on a scarce, government-allocated electromagnetic spectrum; as such, neither of the arguments buttressing the case for broadcast regulation particularly apply to cable television).

Self-regulation by many basic cable networks is undertaken by Standards and Practices (S&P) departments that self-censor their programming because of the pressure put on them by advertisers – also meaning that any basic cable network willing to ignore such pressure could use any of the Seven Dirty Words. All of the words on Carlin's list have come into common usage in many made-for-cable series and film productions.

See also

 Communications Decency Act
 Morality in Media
 Profanity
 Watershed (broadcasting)
 The Green Book (BBC)
 Family Reunion, a song by the American rock band Blink-182 referencing the Seven Dirty Words

References

Further reading

External links

 FCC explanation of indecent, obscene, and profane broadcasts

George Carlin
1972 in American television
Mass media in the United States
Censorship of broadcasting in the United States
Monologues
Stand-up comedy routines
Obscenity controversies
Obscenity controversies in television
Obscenity controversies in stand-up comedy
Profanity
Federal Communications Commission
1972 introductions
Comedy
Sexual slang
1970s in comedy
1972 neologisms